The Alexandra Bridge is a steel arch-span bridge crossing the Fraser River on the north side of Spuzzum, British Columbia and 39 km from Hope, on the Trans-Canada Highway in the Fraser Canyon region of southern British Columbia, Canada. It was constructed between 1960 and 1964 and is the third structure in the area named the Alexandra Bridge.

Built as part of the modernization of the earlier highway by the British Columbia Ministry of Highways during the late 1950s and early 1960s, it replaced the Alexandra Suspension Bridge of 1926, just upstream, which was part of the reconstruction of the Cariboo Wagon Road which was renamed the Fraser Canyon Highway in 1924–25. This second Alexandra Bridge, which itself replaced the original Alexandra Suspension Bridge of 1863 (destroyed in 1894 and remains dismantled in 1912), is still in existence as part of the Alexandra Bridge Provincial Park and has not seen automobile traffic since 1964.

See also
 List of crossings of the Fraser River
 List of bridges in Canada

1964 establishments in British Columbia
Bridges completed in 1964
Bridges over the Fraser River
Bridges on the Trans-Canada Highway
Open-spandrel deck arch bridges in Canada
Fraser Canyon
Road bridges in British Columbia